Dennis Olson may refer to:

 Dennis Olson (ice hockey) (born 1934), Canadian ice hockey player

See also
 Dennis Olsen (disambiguation)